Higgovale is a small, wealthy community in City Bowl of Cape Town, South Africa.

Geography
Higgovale is situated to the south of Camps Bay Drive and is bordered by the suburb of Camps Bay to the west and Oranjezicht to the east with Lions Head to its immediate north west.Higgo Vale is named after the Higgo family who owned the land and the local quarry in the latter part of the 19th Century, and early part of the 20th century. The Higgo family emigrated from Cornwall in 1850. Higgo Vale also contains Higgo Road and Higgo Crescent.

Suburbs of Cape Town